Edward J. Flynn (June 25, 1864 – August 28, 1929) was a professional baseball player for the 1887 Cleveland Blues.:)

External links

1864 births
1929 deaths
Major League Baseball third basemen
Cleveland Blues (1887–88) players
19th-century baseball players
Pueblo Pastimes players
Minneapolis Millers (baseball) players
Kalamazoo Kazoos players
Jackson Jaxons players
Buffalo Bisons (minor league) players
Utica Braves players
Baseball players from Chicago